Giarratana is a town and comune in the province of Ragusa, Sicily, southern Italy. Its name is likely derived from Arabic.

History

An elaborate late-imperial Roman villa with floor mosaics was found in 1989 near Giarratana in the Orto Mosaico district along the "regia trazzera" road.

Several mosaics not only on the floors but also on walls and various decorations were found. The mosaics have floral references and geometric figures that often intertwine with each other.

It covered an area of about 2000 m2, with at least three building wings arranged around a central garden. The excavation campaigns brought to light the north-eastern sector of the villa consisting of seven rooms, a corridor or peristyle, and the east and west wings, added later and probably never completed.

Artifacts found during the excavations include a marble relief depicting the goddess Aphrodite.

Another villa was discovered a few km further south along the SS 194.

Main sights

Church of San Bartolomeo, known from 1308 but rebuilt in the late 17th century.
Remains of Castle of Settimo
Archaeological site of Casmenae, on the road leading to Palazzolo Acreide.

References

External links
 

Municipalities of the Province of Ragusa